Francisco Javier León Franco (13 October 1832 – 10 August 1880) was Vice President of Ecuador in the administration of Gabriel García Moreno from 1869 to 1875, and acting President of Ecuador 6 August 1875 to 6 October 1875. He was Presidents of the Chamber of Deputies in 1865.

References

External links
 Official Website of the Ecuadorian Government about the country President's History

1832 births
1880 deaths
Presidents of Ecuador
Vice presidents of Ecuador
Presidents of the Chamber of Deputies of Ecuador